Jaime Enrique Alas Morales (born 30 July 1989) is a Salvadoran professional footballer who plays as a midfielder for Liga Nacional club Municipal and the El Salvador national team.

Club career
Alas' professional career began in July 2006, at the age of 16, when he signed a contract with the now defunct Salvadoran club San Salvador. Shortly after, he moved to Argentina to play in the reserves of River Plate. He spent four years at the club before returning in 2010 to El Salvador to join Luis Ángel Firpo.

On 29 June 2012, Alas signed a contract with Rosenborg until the end of the 2015-season. He joined the club when the Norwegian transfer window opened on 1 August 2012. He made his debut in a Europa League Qualification match against Servette.

Alas only played a total of seven matches for Rosenborg until he in July 2013 signed a loan deal with the San Jose Earthquakes that lasted until the end of the season in December. After he returned from loan, he transferred to the Mexican second-tier team Ballenas Galeana. in May 2014 it was announced Ballenas Galeana was sold to Club Irapuato in the Mexican Ascenso MX, Jaime Alas was sold to FAS in 2014.

International career
Alas made his debut for El Salvador in an October 2010 friendly match against Panama. Jaime Alas was called up by José Luis Rugamas to train with the senior team in preparation for the 2011 Central American Cup in January 2010. He was successfully able to participate in the 2011 Copa Centroamericana and earned his first goal against the Nicaragua national football team on 14 January 2011. Jaime Alas took part at the 2011 CONCACAF Gold Cup. On 26 March 2012, he scored a goal in the 90+4' against the United States to send El Salvador to the semi-finals of the 2012 CONCACAF Men's Olympic Qualifying Tournament.

Career statistics

Club

International
Scores and results list El Salvador's goal tally first, score column indicates score after each Alas goal.

Honours
Municipal 
Liga Nacional de Guatemala: Clausura 2017, Apertura 2019

References

External links 
 El Grafico Profile  
 

1989 births
Living people
Sportspeople from San Salvador
Salvadoran twins
Twin sportspeople
Salvadoran footballers
El Salvador international footballers
Association football midfielders
San Salvador F.C. footballers
C.D. Luis Ángel Firpo footballers
Ballenas Galeana Morelos footballers
Rosenborg BK players
San Jose Earthquakes players
Ascenso MX players
Eliteserien players
Major League Soccer players
Salvadoran expatriate footballers
Expatriate footballers in Norway
Expatriate soccer players in the United States
Expatriate footballers in Mexico
2011 Copa Centroamericana players
2011 CONCACAF Gold Cup players
2015 CONCACAF Gold Cup players
2017 Copa Centroamericana players
2019 CONCACAF Gold Cup players
2009 CONCACAF U-20 Championship players
C.S.D. Municipal players